Khriezephe is a village located in the Chümoukedima District of Nagaland and is a suburb of Chümoukedima, the district headquarters.

Demographics
Khriezephe is situated in the Chümoukedima District of Nagaland. As per the Population Census 2011, there are a total 72 households in Khriezephe. The total population of Khriezephe is 358.

See also
Chümoukedima District

References

Villages in Chümoukedima district